Geoffrey Alan Vowden (born 27 April 1941) is an English former professional footballer who played as a forward in the Football League for Nottingham Forest, Birmingham City and Aston Villa, and in the North American Soccer League for the New York Cosmos.

Career
Vowden was born in Barnsley, Yorkshire and raised in Jersey. When he was 18, he went to England to join Nottingham Forest, where he signed professional forms at Christmas 1959. After scoring 40 goals in 90 League games for Forest, he was sold to Birmingham City for £25,000 in October 1964.

He spent nearly seven seasons at Birmingham, scoring at a rate of one goal every three matches, and finished as their leading goalscorer three seasons running, from 1964–65 to 1966–67. On 7 September 1968, playing for Birmingham against Huddersfield Town in the Second Division, he became the first substitute to score a hat-trick in a Football League fixture.

In March 1971, Vowden joined Aston Villa for a fee of £12,500. In his first full season at Aston Villa, he scored 11 goals which contributed to the club winning the Third Division championship.

In the summer of 1974, he played for the New York Cosmos in the North American Soccer League. On his return, he joined Southern League club Kettering Town as player/manager, succeeding Ron Atkinson, in December 1974. He later coached domestically and in Hong Kong winning honours with both Bulova SA and South China, and Saudi Arabia. Geoff ended his working career supporting adults with physical and sensory impairments in Corby.

Honours
Aston Villa
 Third Division: 1971–72

References

1941 births
Living people
Footballers from Barnsley
Jersey footballers
English footballers
Association football forwards
Nottingham Forest F.C. players
Birmingham City F.C. players
Aston Villa F.C. players
New York Cosmos players
Kettering Town F.C. players
English Football League players
North American Soccer League (1968–1984) players
Southern Football League players
English football managers
Kettering Town F.C. managers
Southern Football League managers
English expatriates in Saudi Arabia
English expatriate sportspeople in Hong Kong
Expatriate footballers in Hong Kong
English expatriate footballers
English expatriate sportspeople in the United States
Expatriate soccer players in the United States